Oncinotis tenuiloba grows as a scrambling shrub or liana up to  long. Its flowers feature a yellow-green corolla. Vernacular names for the plant include "magic-rope". Its habitat is evergreen forest from sea-level to  altitude. O. tenuiloba is found in Nigeria, Cameroon, the Central African Republic, the Republic of Congo, the Democratic Republic of Congo, Ethiopia, Sudan, Kenya, Uganda, Tanzania, Malawi, Mozambique, Zambia, Zimbabwe and South Africa.

References

External links
 

tenuiloba
Plants described in 1898
Flora of Africa